Lottie Williams (January 20, 1874 – November 16, 1962) was an American character actress whose career spanned both the silent and sound film eras.

Early life
Lottie Williams was born on January 20, 1874, in Indianapolis, Indiana.

Career

She began her career on the stage and appeared in Broadway productions during the 1900s. Williams debuted on film in a supporting role in the 1920 silent comedy, A Full House. She went on to appear in over 70 films, mostly in smaller and supporting roles, during her 30-year career. 

Some of the  more notable films in which she appeared include: Michael Curtiz' Angels with Dirty Faces (1938), starring James Cagney and Pat O'Brien; the 1939 melodrama Dark Victory, with Bette Davis, Humphrey Bogart and George Brent; Meet John Doe (1941), directed by Frank Capra, and starring Gary Cooper and Barbara Stanwyck; the screwball comedy, The Man Who Came to Dinner (1942), starring Bette Davis, Ann Sheridan, and Monty Woolley; and Edge of Darkness (1942), starring Errol Flynn and Ann Sheridan; Her final appearance would be in a supporting role in 1949's One Last Fling, starring Alexis Smith and Zachary Scott, after which she retired from the film industry.

Death
Williams died on November 16, 1962, in Los Angeles, California, and was cremated and interred at Chapel of the Pines Crematory.

Filmography

(Per AFI database)

 A Full House  (1920)   	
 Twin Beds  (1920)   	
 All Soul's Eve  (1921)   	
 Is Matrimony a Failure?  (1922)   	
 The Veiled Woman (1922)	
 The Barefoot Boy (1923)	
 Yesterday's Wife (1923) 	
 The Tomboy  (1924)   	
 The Country Beyond  (1926)   	
 Arizona Nights (1927)  	
 Strictly Modern  (1930)   	
 Wonder Bar  (1934)   	
 6 Day Bike Rider  (1934)   	
 Elinor Norton  (1934)   	
 Registered Nurse  (1934)   	
 Anthony Adverse  (1936)   	
 The Case of the Black Cat  (1936)   	
 I Married a Doctor  (1936)   	
 Murder by an Aristocrat  (1936)   	
 The Story of Louis Pasteur  (1936)   	
 Wine, Women and Horses  (1937)   	
 That Man's Here Again  (1937)   	
 The Cherokee Strip  (1937)   	
 Submarine D-1  (1937)   	
 The Great O'Malley  (1937)
 Empty Holsters  (1937)   	
 The Beloved Brat  (1938)   	
 Angels with Dirty Faces  (1938)   	
 The Sisters  (1938)   	
 Nancy Drew... Detective  (1938)   	
 Love, Honor and Behave  (1938)   	
 Little Miss Thoroughbred  (1938)   	
 Penrod and His Twin Brother  (1938)   	
 The Roaring Twenties  (1939) (uncredited)  	
 King of the Underworld  (1939) (uncredited)  	
 Dark Victory  (1939) as Lucy  	
 On Trial  (1939)   	
 No Place to Go  (1939)   	
 Off the Record  (1939)   	
 Blackwell's Island  (1939)   	
 Espionage Agent  (1939)   	
 Four Wives  (1939)   	
 Yes, My Darling Daughter  (1939)   	
 Private Detective  (1939)   	
 Money and the Woman  (1940)   	
 Dancing on a Dime  (1940)   	
 A Fugitive from Justice  (1940)   	
 Ladies Must Live  (1940)   	
 Calling All Husbands  (1940)   	
 Always a Bride  (1940)   	
 The Man Who Talked Too Much  (1940)   	
 An Angel from Texas  (1940)   	
 The Great Mr. Nobody  (1941)   	
 The Nurse's Secret  (1941)   	
 Passage from Hong Kong  (1941)   	
 One Foot in Heaven  (1941)   	
 Meet John Doe  (1941)   	
 The Man Who Came to Dinner  (1942) Fan at train station (uncredited)   	
 All Through the Night  (1942)   	
 Busses Roar  (1942)   	
 Edge of Darkness  (1943)   	
 The Gorilla Man  (1943)   	
 Mr. Skeffington  (1944)   	
 Hotel Berlin  (1945)   	
 One More Tomorrow  (1946)   	
 Shadow of a Woman  (1946)   	
 Two Guys from Milwaukee  (1946)   	
 Nora Prentiss  (1947)   	
 The Big Punch  (1948)   	
 June Bride  (1948)   	
 To the Victor  (1948)   	
 A Kiss in the Dark  (1949)   	
 One Last Fling  (1949)

References

External links

 
 
 

American film actresses
American silent film actresses
20th-century American actresses
Actresses from Indianapolis
1874 births
1962 deaths
Burials at Chapel of the Pines Crematory